16 Reception Depot was an administrative unit of the Personnel Service Corps of the South African Army.

History

Origin
16 Reception Depot was activated as the reception depot to service the then Western Cape Command.

SADF era and the Bush War
The unit was used to mobilize white troops in the greater Western Cape area. This involved:
 the registering of young white males at schools
 the issuing of call-up papers
 confirmation of the recruits arrival
 the transport of these recruits to various allotted training units

SANDF era
By the early 2000s, Commands were no longer responsible for individual recruitment, making Reception Depots essentially redundant.

Insignia

Leadership

References

South African Army
Disbanded military units and formations in Cape Town